La sombra del ciprés es alargada ("The Shadow of the Cypress is Long") is a 1990 Mexican-Spanish film directed by Luis Alcoriza. It is based on the book of the same name, written by Miguel Delibes.

References

External links
 

1990 films
1990s Spanish-language films
Films directed by Luis Alcoriza
Films based on Spanish novels
Mexican drama films
Spanish drama films
Films shot in the province of Ávila
1990 drama films
1990s Spanish films
1990s Mexican films